The Sukhoi P-1 was a prototype Soviet interceptor.

Development

Sukhoi began design studies for what was to become Izdeliye P in 1954 to meet an urgent request from the Ministry of Aviation Industry (MAP – Ministerstvo Aviatsionnoy Promyshlennosti – ministry of aviation industry). The early studies considered crew size, armament (missiles, cannon or both), and powerplant (with a choice of Lyul'ka AL-9 or AL-11, Klimov VK-9F, Kuznetsov P-2 or Kuznetsov P-4 engines).

The P-1 was designed for the Uragan-1 (Hurricane-1) collision-course intercept radar, which was quite complex and bulky, requiring a crew of two and air intakes either side of the fuselage rather than at the nose, retaining the delta wing of the Sukhoi T-3 with 57-degree leading edge sweep. Although the production aircraft was intended to use the Lyul'ka AL-9 engine, then in development, the prototype was fitted with a Lyulka AL-7F of lower power.

The P-1 first flew in July 1957 but underwent only limited flight testing due to unavailability of the intended powerplant and ongoing problems with the radar and missile systems as well as lukewarm enthusiasm from the VVS (Voyenno-Vozdooshnyye Seely – Soviet air forces). OKB-51 persisted for some time trying to raise enthusiasm for the P-1 by proposing an even bigger engine, the Tumansky R-15-300 afterburning turbojet, with singular lack of success. The sole P-1 prototype was relegated to experimental work and later scrapped.

A second prototype, the P-2 was studied, powered by twin Klimov VK-11 engines in the rear fuselage, but this version was cancelled at the mock-up review stage.

Specifications (P-1 as designed)

References

Further reading
 

P-1
1950s Soviet fighter aircraft
Abandoned military aircraft projects of the Soviet Union
Single-engined jet aircraft
Delta-wing aircraft
Aircraft first flown in 1957